This is a list of marae (Māori and Moriori meeting grounds) in the Chatham Islands in New Zealand.

In October 2020, the Government committed $160,440 through the Provincial Growth Fund to upgrade Whakamaharatanga Marae, with the intention of creating six jobs.

List of marae

See also
 Lists of marae in New Zealand
 List of marae in Canterbury, New Zealand
 List of schools in the Chatham Islands

References

Chatham Islands, List of marae in the
Marae
Marae in Chatham Islands, List of